Sir Ian Derek Gainsford ( Ginsberg; born 24 June 1930) is a British retired dentist and academic. He was dean of King's College School of Medicine and Dentistry, King's College London (1988–1997) and vice-principal of King's College London (1994–1997). He is president of the Maccabaeans, a Zionist society.

Early life 

Sir Ian was the son of Rabbi Dr Morris Ginsberg and his wife,  Anne Freda (Aucken) Ginsberg.

He was educated at Thames Valley Grammar School, Twickenham, King's College London and at the University of Toronto.

Career 
 Junior Staff, King’s College Hospital, 1955–57
 Member of staff, Dept of Conservative Dentistry, London Hospital Medical School, 1957–70
 Senior Lecturer/Consultant, Dept of Conservative Dentistry, KCH, 1970–97
 Deputy Dean of Dental Studies, 1973–77; Dir of Clinical Dental Services, KCH, 1977–87 (Dean of Dental Studies, KCH Medical School, 1977–83)
 Dean, Faculty of Clinical Dentistry, KCL, 1983–87

Other positions 
 President, British Society for Restorative Dentistry, 1973–74
 Member: BDA, 1956– (President, Metropolitan Branch, 1981–82)
 President, American Dental Society of London, 1982)
 President, Western Marble Arch Synagogue, 1998–2000
 Honorary President, British Friends of Magen David Adom, 1995–

He wrote the standard textbook Silver Amalgam in Clinical Practice (1965, 3rd edn 1992)

Honours 
 Fellow in Dental Surgery of the Royal College of Surgeons, 1967
 Fellow in Dental Surgery of the Royal College of Surgeons of Edinburgh, 1998
 He was knighted in 1995.

References
 Who's Who 2007
 Jewish Year Book 2007

Living people
1930 births
British Jews
English dentists
Alumni of King's College London
Associates of King's College London
Academics of King's College London
People associated with King's College London
Fellows of King's College London
Knights Bachelor
University of Toronto alumni